Evaldas Jocys (born 25 May 1975 in Plungė, Lithuanian SSR) is a former Lithuanian professional basketball player. He last played for his hometown team Olimpas Plungė.

College career 
Jocys played in the NCAA Division I's East Carolina Pirates for two seasons. In his sophomore year, he led the team with 13.8 points, 6.2 rebounds and 2.1 assists per game. He also played for Western Nebraska Community College and earned NJCAA 1st Team All-American award in 1998.

Professional career 
Jocys started his professional career in 1993 with Olimpas Plungė. He left the team four years later and studied in America for a couple of years before returning to Europe. He played for various teams in Israel, Germany and Belgium, most notably for Hapoel Galil Elyon participating in Saporta Cup. He averaged 4.8 assists per game despite being a 2.03 m (6 ft 8 in) big man in that tournament.

Youth team 
Jocys won a gold medal in the 1996 FIBA Europe Under-22 Championship while representing Lithuania. He also participated in the 1997 FIBA Under-21 World Championship, finishing in 8th place.

Personal life 
Jocys's niece is Justė Jocytė, a Lithuanian women's basketball phenom. His brother played college basketball in the United States.

References

1975 births
Living people
East Carolina Pirates men's basketball players
Eisbären Bremerhaven players
Hapoel Galil Elyon players
Lithuanian men's basketball players
Lithuanian expatriate basketball people in the United States
Sportspeople from Plungė
Western Nebraska Cougars men's basketball players
Power forwards (basketball)